Timarchus or Timarch was a tyrant of the ancient Greek city of Miletus in the 3rd century BC. He was put in power after the Ptolemaic conquest of Miletus in 279 BC. He with Ptolemy I Epigone led a revolt against Ptolemy II Philadelphus of Egypt in 259 BC. He was slain the next year by the Seleucid king Antiochus II during the course of the second Syrian war between the Seleucid kingdom and Egypt. The grateful citizens of Miletus awarded the surname of "Theos" (God) to the king who freed their city.

References
 Dictionary of Greek and Roman Biography and Mythology, page 1134 (v. 3)

Ancient Milesians
Ancient Greek tyrants
3rd-century BC Greek people
258 BC deaths
Year of birth unknown